These are the official results of the Men's 800 metres event at the 1995 IAAF World Championships in Gothenburg, Sweden. There were a total number of 49 participating athletes, with two semi-finals, and seven qualifying heats and the final held on Tuesday August 8, 1995.

The final pared down to 8runners who believed in their kick.  Vebjørn Rodal became the leader with Wilson Kipketer at the end of the field.  Rodal led through an easy pace 52.53 through the first lap.  With 200 to go, Nico Motchebon moved to the front, covered by Kipketer, but Rodal didn't relinquish the lead.  Kipketer timed his big burst for 70 metres before the finish, Rodal had no answer but held off Motchebon, the rest of the field fading away. Coming from behind Motchebon, Arthémon Hatungimana was able to gradually gain on Rodall, passing him just a step before the finish.

Medalists

Qualifying heats
Held on Saturday 1995-08-05

Semi-finals
Held on Sunday 1995-08-06

Final

References
 Results

H
800 metres at the World Athletics Championships